Chris Marinelli (born March 3, 1987 in Quincy, Massachusetts) is former American football offensive tackle. He was signed as an undrafted free agent by the Denver Broncos in 2010. He played in college at Stanford.

Early years
Marinelli was born in Quincy Massachusetts and moved to Braintree Massachusetts while in high school. Marinelli attended Boston College High School in Dorchester, Boston, where he was a three-year starter at defensive tackle and two-year starter on offense, where he played tight end as a junior and offensive tackle as a senior. For his career, he finished with 160 tackles, 17 quarterback sacks, 12 pass breakups, 10 forced fumbles, five fumble recoveries, one interception and a forced safety.

Considered a three-star recruit by Rivals.com, Marinelli was listed as the No. 46 offensive tackle prospect in the nation. He chose Stanford over Boston College and Duke University.

College career
After redshirting his initial year at Stanford, Marinelli played in 10 games and started five of the last six games at right tackle. He was named to the Pac-10's All-Freshman team. Having established himself as a solid player, Marinelli started all 12 games at right tackle in his sophomore season.

In his junior year, he started 11 of 12 games, missing only the Washington State game with an injury. He earned All-Pacific-10 honorable mention honors for the second consecutive time.

In 2009, Marinelli was moved over to the left side, and helped set a new school-record for rushing with 2,692 yards, breaking the 1949 record of 2,481 yards. The Cardinal offensive line allowed a Pac-10 low six sacks on the year, which was the second lowest total in the nation. Marinelli earned All-Pac-10 First-team honors and was also an All-American selection by Rivals.com

Professional career

Denver Broncos
Marinelli was signed by the Broncos on April 26, 2010.  He was released on July 27, 2010.

Indianapolis Colts
Marinelli was claimed off waivers on July 28, 2010, by the Indianapolis Colts.  He was released by the Colts on September 4, 2010.

References

External links
Denver Broncos bio
Stanford Cardinal bio

1987 births
Living people
Sportspeople from Braintree, Massachusetts
Players of American football from Massachusetts
American football offensive tackles
Stanford Cardinal football players
Denver Broncos players
Indianapolis Colts players
Boston College High School alumni